Franz Hegi (Lausanne, 16 April 1774 - Zürich, 14 March 1850) was a Swiss painter.

External links

References 

18th-century Swiss painters
18th-century Swiss male artists
Swiss male painters
19th-century Swiss painters
1774 births
1850 deaths
19th-century Swiss male artists